The 11th Asian Swimming Championships  is scheduled to be held in 2023 at New Clark City in Capas, Philippines.

Host selection

The Asia Swimming Federation (AASF) said they were looking at three Asian countries as the possible host of the event: Vietnam, Thailand, and the Philippines. In the end, the Philippines was chosen because of the newly built and the first FINA-certified facility of the country, the New Clark City Aquatic Center, which was used as a venue for aquatics events at the 2019 Southeast Asian Games previously. In December 2019, the  AASF, Philippine Swimming, the Bases Conversion and Development Authority and the Philippine Sports Commission signed a partnership agreement for the Philippines to host the event.

Postponement
The Asian Swimming Championships was originally scheduled to be held from November 7 to 17, 2020. However, due to the COVID-19 pandemic, it was rescheduled to November 7–17, 2021. It was then further postponed to 2023.

References

Asian Championships
Asian Swimming Championships
Sports in Tarlac
Asian Swimming Championships
Asian Swimming Championships